Lotte Hi-Mart is a South Korean retailer of electronic goods. It was originally a unit of bankrupt Daewoo Electronics that founder Seon Jong-koo spun off in 1999. Hi-Mart is headquartered in Seoul. Hi-mart was taken over by Lotte Corporation on July 6, 2012.

History
Seon Jong-koo was formerly employed by Daewoo Electronics. When the company went bankrupt in 1999, he joined a spin-off company that became Hi-Mart.

In June 2008, South Korean chaebol Eugene Group acquired 32.4% of Hi-Mart. in June 2010, the company went public.

In July 2012, Lotte Corporation acquired a 65.3% of Hi-Mart for $1.1 billion. Hi-Mart operated 290 stores in Korea, controlling 35% of the market. The acquisition was maneuvered in the midst of a scandal about its founder and CEO, Seon Jong-koo, accused of embezzlement totaling $228 million. In April 2012, one witness jumped out his apartment's window after being questioned by Korea's justice about bribing Seon Jong-koo. In December 2014, Seon Jong-koo was replaced by Lee Dong-woo. He was the second largest shareholder of the company and heavily supported by Hi-Mart's employees.

In October 2012, the deal was OKed by the FTC and the company announced it is changing the stores' names to Lotte Hi-Mart.

See also
Electronic commerce
Online auction business model
Shopping mall

External links
Hi-Mart Homepage

References

Companies based in Seoul
Online retailers of South Korea
Lotte Corporation subsidiaries
Companies listed on the Korea Exchange